Neognophomyia is a genus of crane fly in the family Limoniidae.

Distribution
South & Central America

Species
N. adara Alexander, 1949
N. bisecta (Alexander, 1920)
N. bisetosa Alexander, 1944
N. citripes Alexander, 1945
N. cochlearis Alexander, 1945
N. colombicola Alexander, 1931
N. consociata Alexander, 1942
N. crassistyla Alexander, 1967
N. cuzcoensis Alexander, 1967
N. debilitata Alexander, 1949
N. heliconiae Alexander, 1945
N. hirsuta (Alexander, 1913)
N. hostica Alexander, 1943
N. immaculipennis (Alexander, 1926)
N. interrupta Alexander, 1944
N. latifascia (Alexander, 1926)
N. monophora Alexander, 1941
N. obtusilamina Alexander, 1952
N. panamensis Alexander, 1930
N. paprzyckiana Alexander, 1944
N. pervicax (Alexander, 1914)
N. pinckerti Alexander, 1962
N. productissima Alexander, 1944
N. scapha Alexander, 1945
N. scaphoides Alexander, 1952
N. schildi Alexander, 1945
N. setilobata Alexander, 1949
N. sparsiseta Alexander, 1945
N. spectralis Alexander, 1944
N. trinitatis Alexander, 1927

References

Limoniidae
Nematocera genera
Diptera of South America